Maestro Thief is a 1994 Russian action film directed by Vladimir Shamshurin.

Plot 
The son of one famous artist contacted a suspicious company and as a result he must pay a lot of money to scammers. Now the artist is thinking how to take revenge.

Cast 
 Vladimir Ferapontov		
 Anatoli Golik
 Ilya Ilin
 Nina Ilyina
 M. Kochukov
 Viktor Kosykh
 Alexandru Lungu
 Eduard Martsevich
 Anastasiya Nemolyaeva		
 Andrey Nevraev

References

External links 
 

1990s action adventure films
1994 films
1990s Russian-language films
Russian action adventure films